Tavua Island is an island of the Mamanuca Islands, Fiji. Tavua was used as a tribe name in Survivor: Game Changers.

See also

 List of islands

References

Islands of Fiji
Mamanuca Islands